Olga Sharutenko (born 1 April 1978) is a Russian former competitive ice dancer. With Dmitri Naumkin, she is the 1995 World Junior champion, a two-time Nebelhorn Trophy champion (1995 and 1997), the 1996 Karl Schäfer Memorial, and a two-time Winter Universiade champion (1997 and 1999).

Personal life 
Sharutenko was born 1 April 1978 in Yekaterinburg, Russian SFSR, Soviet Union. Her mother was a former figure skater.

Career 
Sharutenko began skating at age five and a half and taking ballet lessons from age six.

Partnership with Naumkin 
Sharutenko skated in partnership with Dmitri Naumkin for fifteen years, training twice daily, six days a week during their competitive career. In November 1994, the duo won gold at the 1995 World Junior Championships in Budapest, ahead of France's Stéphanie Guardia / Franck Laporte.

Sharutenko/Naumkin moved up to the senior level in the 1995–96 season, taking gold at the 1995 Nebelhorn Trophy, silver at Czech Skate, and bronze at the Lysiane Lauret Challenge. Making their Champions Series (Grand Prix) debut, they placed 7th at the 1995 NHK Trophy.

The following season, Sharutenko/Naumkin were awarded gold at the 1996 Karl Schäfer Memorial and bronze at the 1996 Skate Israel. In the absence of Oksana Grishuk / Evgeni Platov and Anjelika Krylova / Oleg Ovsiannikov, they won silver at the 1997 Russian Championships behind Irina Lobacheva / Ilia Averbukh. They concluded their season with gold at  the 1997 Winter Universiade in Jeonju, South Korea, ahead of fellow Russians Nina Ulanova / Mikhail Stifunin.

During the next two seasons, Sharutenko/Naumkin finished off the Russian national podium but won gold at the 1997 Nebelhorn Trophy and 1999 Winter Universiade. They competed together until the end of the 1998–99 season, coached by Alexei Gorshkov.

Post-competitive career 
After retiring from competition, Sharutenko performed in shows with the Russian Ice Stars. She joined the Imperial Ice Stars in 2003. She has performed in Swan Lake on Ice, Sleeping Beauty, The Nutcracker, and other ice shows. Sharutenko has danced en pointe on ice. She appeared in two editions of the ITV's Dancing on Ice, skating with John Barrowman in series 1 (2006) and with Keith Chegwin in series 8 (2013).

Competitive highlights 
GP: Champions Series / Grand Prix

With Naumkin

References

External links
 OlgaSharutenko.com

Russian female ice dancers
Living people
1978 births
Sportspeople from Yekaterinburg
World Junior Figure Skating Championships medalists
Universiade medalists in figure skating
Universiade gold medalists for Russia
Competitors at the 1997 Winter Universiade
Competitors at the 1999 Winter Universiade